The Ramban Synagogue is the second oldest active synagogue in the Old City of Jerusalem, after only the Karaite Synagogue. It dates back in its current location to sometime around 1400. Tradition holds that as an institution, it was founded by the scholar and rabbi Moshe ben Nachman, also known as Nachmanides or Ramban, in 1267, but at a more southerly location on Mount Zion, to help rebuild the local Jewish community, which indeed expanded because of the synagogue's presence. The synagogue was moved to its current location around 1400, where it was destroyed in 1474, rebuilt in 1475, and continued functioning until being closed by the Muslim authorities in the late 16th century. The building was used for industrial and commercial purposes until its destruction in the 1948 Jordanian siege of the Jewish Quarter. After the 1967 Six-Day War, it was rebuilt over the old ruins and reconsecrated as a synagogue.

Description
The foundation of the building comprises vaults resting on Romanesque and Byzantine capitals. Along with the fact that there are no Gothic or Islamic architectural features, this suggests that the original building predates the Crusader period.

The synagogue is located three meters below street level, to comply with Muslim restrictions for Dhimmi houses of prayer not to be higher than mosques. The western entrance opens up to the Jewish Quarter Road and leads through the study hall or beit midrash to the main room, while the southern entrance can be reached from a staircase leading down from the Hurva Synagogue.

The synagogue's prayer hall has an elongated and slightly trapeze-like shape (21.5 m by 6.7-7.3 m). Four columns, all in secondary use and with unadorned square capitals, are splitting the hall into two isles. The fifth one was removed and placed outside the southern entrance, in order to create space for the bimah, which takes a central position but never stood under a dome. The western end of the prayer hall has been extended in order to allow for a women's section, while the other, eastern end holds the Torah arks, one at the end of each isle.

History

13th/14th century synagogue

Tradition
Tradition has it that Nachmanides was the one who founded the synagogue.

After the Disputation of Barcelona, Nachmanides was exiled from Aragon, and in 1267 he made aliyah to the Land of Israel. In an alleged letter to his son, he described the Jewish community of Jerusalem devastated by the Khwarezmian "Tatars":

Seventy two years old, he undertook the effort to rebuild the Jewish community and chose a ruined house on Mount Zion to reconstruct it as a synagogue. A number of Jews moved to Jerusalem after hearing of Nachmanides' arrival. The Torah scrolls that were evacuated to Nablus (near biblical Shechem) before the Mongol invasion were returned. In three weeks, for Rosh Hashanah, the synagogue was ready for use.

Scholarly view
Norman Roth, a scholar specialised in medieval Jewish history, dates the establishment of the synagogue as an institution to the 13th century or "somewhat later", with Avraham David dating its establishment firmly at the beginning of the 15th century, but possibly referring to the building as such in its final location. Both agree that the tradition is at least problematic. The authenticity of Nachmanides' letter to his son, along with several other letters attributed to him, is contested. Many details in it are doubtful, starting with the questions on Nachmanides ever reaching Jerusalem, and continuing with doubts on the small number of Jews (just two) after Saladin's 1188 call to them to resettle Palestine, and on why a scholar of Nachmanides' rank would need to bring Torah scrolls from Nablus, the capital of the Samaritans, which Jews considered to be heretics. Obadiah Bertinoro, the next source on the synagogue, writes in 1488 about it without ever mentioning the name Ramban/Nachmanides in his description In the first half of the 16th century there are already signs of the fictitious connection with the Ramban being circulated.

15th-16th century synagogue
According to Jewish educator Larry Domnitch, after a period of steady growth of the Jewish community, which was centered on the synagogue and yeshiva established by Nachmanides, around the year 1400 the synagogue was relocated further north, away from its initial location on Mount Zion.

A. David and others write that the synagogue established soon after 1400 was destroyed in 1474, then rebuilt in 1475. Ovadiah of Bertinoro, who arrives in Jerusalem in 1488, leaves a description of the synagogue, followed by one by Moses Bassola who visits in the early 1520s.

Traces of an erroneous attribution of the synagogue to Nachmanides can be already found in 1537.

In 1523, the synagogue was described as "the only Jewish place of worship in Jerusalem". In 1586 it was still used commonly by both the Sephardic and Ashkenazi communities.

Late 16th century: closure

In 1586, the synagogue was closed under the order of the Turkish governor of Jerusalem. Subsequently, the Sephardic community established their center in the adjacent place, where the academy belonging to the tanna Yochanan ben Zakai was said to have stood during the Second Temple period. Today the Yochanan ben Zakai Synagogue stands there.

The Nachmanides Synagogue shared a wall with the Sidna Umar Mosque and was described as similar in design. Ottoman authorities issued a firman to lock the synagogue door due to local complaints of 'noisy ceremonies' and further legal disputes were prohibited after the 1598 confiscation.

 wrote in 1845 how the medieval synagogue building and its later additions constituted the Jewish "court", a complex of buildings "constructed after the style of a monastery" and aligned from both sides along an inner space, a "large court, which forms as it were a whole street", the "Synagogue of the Ashkenazim" mentioned in the quote here-below. Schwarz further cites a 1628 document stating that the main building, the synagogue proper, was confiscated in 1588 by a particularly Jewish-hating mufti who dedicated it to "profane" purposes, and as such the building became known in Arabic as the "Al Maraga".

17th to 19th century: industrial use
In 1845, Joseph Schwarz, considered by the Jewish Encyclopedia (1901-1906) as "the greatest Jewish authority on Palestinian matters since Estori Farḥi" proposed the identification of the modern synagogue – then known as "Al Maraga" in Arabic and previously at the centre of the "Synagogue of the Ashkenazim" compound – with the traditional Ramban Synagogue:

The 1628 text quoted by Schwarz also mentions a qadi who, during that very year, extorted a large amount of money, 1000 grosh, from the Jewish community in order to recognise their property rights and stop the transformation of "Al Maraga" into a raisin mill, and the construction of several shops "out of the hall and front of the Synagogue". In spite of the retroactive and valid property deed issued by the corrupt qadi, in Schwarz's own time were Al Maraga was indeed used as a raisin mill and the shops had been built "in the outer hall", "although they happen to be at present the property of the Jews."

In 1835, the community leaders managed to obtain permission from Ibrahim Pasha, the Egyptian conqueror and governor of Greater Syria, for the renovation of the synagogues, of which the Sephardic ones were unified into a single unit, known today as the Four Sephardic Synagogues. With the permission of his father, Muhammad Ali Pasha the ruler of Egypt, the complex known as the "Synagogue of the Ashkenazim" was returned to the Ashkenazi community in 1836, but without the actual main building, "Al Maraga", a goal seen by Schwarz as certain to attain, had it been not for the Ottomans regaining power over the territory from Muhammad Ali by 1841.

20th century: destruction and reconsecration
The building was used as a cheese factory at an unspecified time.

N. Roth wrote in 2014 that the building was completely destroyed by the Jordanian Arab Legion in 1948, with nothing remaining except for plans and photos produced before the May–July 1948 Siege of Jerusalem.

The synagogue we see today has been built on the ruins of the one seen by Bertinoro and Bassola.

As a result of the 1967 Six-Day War, Jews regained access to the property, and a synagogue with a beit midrash, or Torah study hall, was opened there. Today it is used by the Ashkenazi community.

Second Ramban Synagogue in Jerusalem
Today there is a second Ramban Synagogue in Jerusalem, established after 1948 and rebuilt in 2005 in West Jerusalem, as opposed to the historical one, which stands in the Old City. It is located at 4 Amatsya Street in the Katamon neighbourhood. It made the headlines in 2016, when Carmit Feintuch became its communal leader, the first woman to be hired in this position at an Orthodox synagogue in Israel.

See also
Oldest synagogues in the world
Cave of the Ramban

References

External links

Synagogues of the World. Jerusalem (Jewish Virtual Library)
Moshe ben Nahman RaMBaN Synagogue (sephardiccouncil.org)
How Nachmanides Rebuilt Jerusalem (aish.com)

13th-century synagogues
1267 establishments in Asia
Ashkenazi Jewish culture in Jerusalem
Ashkenazi synagogues
Nachmanides
Synagogues in Jerusalem
Rebuilt synagogues